So This Is Love (also known as The Grace Moore Story) is a 1953 American musical drama film directed by Gordon Douglas, based on the life of singer Grace Moore. The film stars Kathryn Grayson as Moore, and Merv Griffin. The story chronicles Moore's rise to stardom from 1918 to February 7, 1928 when she made her debut at the Metropolitan Opera.

Plot
Grace Moore (Kathryn Grayson) dreams of being a great opera singer. She starts out singing at a nightclub, where she meets her boyfriend Buddy (Merv Griffin). She takes singing lessons and Buddy pressures her to marry him and move out of the city. Grace, however, cannot give up on her career.

At one point her dreams may be dashed, as poor singing instruction has inflamed her vocal cords. Under the direction of a new, better voice coach, she is told to rest and not speak for three months. She does so, but Buddy Nash marries another woman while Grace is secluded in a cabin.

Upon Grace's return to New York City, she is able to sing again and continues her lessons. She is hired as an understudy in a musical and takes over when the leading lady (Marie Windsor) falls ill. Grace's performance impresses the producers so much that she is made a star on Broadway. Her next boyfriend, Bryan Curtis (Douglas Dick), dates her for two years before insisting they marry, to which Grace agrees.

When Grace auditions for the Metropolitan Opera, she is told that she lacks experience and that her youth, charm and voice are better suited to musical comedies. She wagers Otto Kahn (Roy Gordon), the Manager of Metropolitan Opera, that she will perform there within two years. She quits her musical contract and books passage to Europe in order to get better vocal training. Bryan says he can't compete with her dream and ends their engagement.

Two years later Grace has returned and sings in a starring role at the Metropolitan. She is a success and has finally achieved her dream to be an opera star.

Cast

According to her 1959 autobiography My Story, actress Mary Astor wrote that in late 1952, she had been initially cast by Warner Brothers in So This Is Love (then titled The Grace Moore Story) for the role of Aunt Laura Stokley. Before actual filming began, Astor had even made some camera tests but had to bow out of the film after breaking her leg from a fall in her home. The role went to Rosemary DeCamp. (My Story: An Autobiography by Mary Astor pgs. 219-220 Windham Press)

Soundtrack

So This Is Love is a jukebox musical. The soundtrack consists of various songs from multiple composers. Songs, such as Remember by Irving Berlin and Pack Up Your Troubles... by Felix Powell and George Henry Powell, were released prior to and not written for the film.

Track listing
 Voi, Che Sapete – Kathryn Grayson
 Time On My Hands – Kathryn Grayson
 The Tickle Toe – Kathryn Grayson
 The Kiss Waltz – Kathryn Grayson
 Remember – Kathryn Grayson
 Oh Me! Oh My! – Kathryn Grayson
 I Wish I Could Shimmy Like My Sister Kate – Kathryn Grayson
 Ciribiribin – Kathryn Grayson
 Ah! Je Ris De Me Voir Si Belle (The Jewel Song) – Kathryn Grayson
 Christ The Lord Is Risen Today
 I Kiss Your Hand, Madame – Merv Griffin
 I'm Just Wild About Harry
 In Dat Great Gittin' Up Morning – Noreen Corcoran
 Je Veux Vivre (Juliet's Waltz Song) – Kathryn Grayson
 Memories
 Pack Up Your Troubles in Your Old Kit Bag and Smile, Smile, Smile!
 Si, Mi Chiamano Mimi (Mimi's Aria) – Kathryn Grayson
 So This Is Love

References

External links

1953 films
1950s biographical films
1953 musical films
American biographical films
Biographical films about singers
Films about opera
Films directed by Gordon Douglas
Films scored by Max Steiner
Films scored by Ray Heindorf
Warner Bros. films
Cultural depictions of classical musicians
Cultural depictions of American women
1950s English-language films
1950s American films